The 2021–22 Associate international cricket season was from September 2021 to April 2022. All official twenty over matches between Associate members of the ICC were eligible to have full Twenty20 International (T20I) or Women's Twenty20 International (WT20I) status, as the International Cricket Council (ICC) granted T20I status to matches between all of its members from 1 July 2018 (women's teams) and 1 January 2019 (men's teams). The season included all T20I/WT20I cricket series mostly involving ICC Associate members, that were played in addition to series covered in International cricket in 2021–22.

Season overview

September

2021 ICC Women's T20 World Cup EAP Qualifier

The tournament was cancelled due to COVID-19 pandemic.

2021 ICC Women's T20 World Cup Africa Qualifier

2021–22 Uganda Tri-Nation Series

 Advanced to the final

Belgium women in Austria

October

Estonia in Cyprus and 2021 Cyprus T20I Cup

2021 ICC T20 World Cup EAP Qualifier

The tournament was cancelled due to COVID-19 pandemic.

2021 ICC T20 World Cup Europe Qualifier

 advanced to the global qualifier

2021 ICC T20 World Cup Africa Qualifier A

 advanced to the regional final

2021 ICC Women's T20 World Cup Americas Qualifier

 advanced to the global qualifier

Sierra Leone in Nigeria

2021 Valletta Cup and Gibraltar in Malta

2021 ICC T20 World Cup Asia Qualifier A

 advanced to the global qualifier

November

2021 ICC T20 World Cup Africa Qualifier B

 advanced to the regional final

2021 ICC T20 World Cup Americas Qualifier

 advanced to the global qualifier

2021 ICC Men's T20 World Cup Asia Qualifier Group B

The tournament was cancelled due to COVID-19 pandemic.

Nepal women in Qatar

2021 ICC T20 World Cup Africa Qualifier Final

 advanced to the global qualifier

2021 ICC Women's T20 World Cup Asia Qualifier

 advanced to the global qualifier

January

2022 Commonwealth Games Qualifier

February

2021–22 Oman Quadrangular Series

2022 ICC T20 World Cup Global Qualifier A

 Advanced to the semi-finals
 Advanced to the consolation play-offs

March

2022 GCC Women's Gulf Cup

2021–22 Nepal T20I Tri-Nation Series

2022 Nigeria Invitational Women's T20I Tournament

April

Uganda in Namibia

Bahamas in the Cayman Islands

2022 Capricorn Women's Tri-Series

 Advanced to the final

Hong Kong women in UAE

See also
 International cricket in 2021–22

Notes

References

2021 in cricket
2022 in cricket